Caroline Povey (born 1 June 1980) is a British sport shooter. She competed for England in the women's trap event at the 2014 Commonwealth Games where she won a bronze medal.

References

1980 births
Living people
English female sport shooters
Commonwealth Games bronze medallists for England
Shooters at the 2014 Commonwealth Games
Commonwealth Games medallists in shooting
British female sport shooters
Medallists at the 2014 Commonwealth Games